Carrie Richerson (November 1, 1952 - February 2, 2019) was an American science fiction fan and bookseller who was also a science fiction writer repeatedly nominated for international awards.

Biography
Born Carrie Richerson in Mississippi November 1, 1952, she got her degree from Rice University in Houston, Texas where she studied Mathematics. She lived in Austin where she was involved in the local science fiction fandom and where she worked  as a bookseller. Richerson was involved in running conventions and she was part of the team that ran  the 1997 Worldcon, LoneStarCon 2. She also wrote short fiction, beginning in the 1990s. Her work was published in a number of magazines, including Amazing Stories, Asimov’s, F&SF, Pulphouse, and Realms of Fantasy. Richerson was nominated for a Campbell Award twice. Her work also appeared in a collection and other anthologies. Elizabeth Moon thanked her in her novel Against the Odds in 2000. Richerson died in 2019 in an Austin rehabilitation center due to years of poor health.

Selected works

Short fiction 

Sheriff Doris Webster & the Returning Dead
 A Dying Breed, (1992)
 The Light at the End of the Day, (1993)
 The Quick and the Dead, (1997)

Poetry

References and sources

1952 births
2019 deaths
Rice University alumni
20th-century American women writers
21st-century American women writers
The Magazine of Fantasy & Science Fiction people
American science fiction writers